Dichlorocarbene is the reactive intermediate with chemical formula CCl2. Although this chemical species has not been isolated, it is a common intermediate in organic chemistry, being generated from chloroform. This bent diamagnetic molecule rapidly inserts into other bonds.

Preparation
Dichlorocarbene is most commonly generated by reaction of chloroform and a base such as potassium tert-butoxide or aqueous sodium hydroxide. A phase transfer catalyst, for instance benzyltriethylammonium bromide, facilitates the migration of the hydroxide in the organic phase.
HCCl3 + NaOH → CCl2 + NaCl + H2O

Other reagents and routes
Another precursor to dichlorocarbene is ethyl trichloroacetate. Upon treatment with sodium methoxide it releases CCl2.

Phenyl(trichloromethyl)mercury decomposes thermally to release CCl2.
PhHgCCl3 → CCl2 + PhHgCl

Dichlorodiazirine, which is stable in the dark, decomposes into dichlorocarbene and nitrogen via photolysis.

Dichlorocarbene can also be obtained by dechlorination of carbon tetrachloride with magnesium with ultrasound chemistry. This method is tolerant to esters and carbonyl compounds because it does not involve strong base.

Reactions

With alkenes
Dichlorocarbene reacts with alkenes in a formal [1+2]cycloaddition to form geminal dichlorocyclopropanes. These can be reduced to cyclopropanes or hydrolysed to give cyclopropanones by a geminal halide hydrolysis. Dichlorocyclopropanes may also be converted to allenes in the Skattebøl rearrangement.

With phenols
In the Reimer–Tiemann reaction dichlorocarbene reacts with phenols to give the ortho-formylated product. e.g. phenol to salicylaldehyde.

With amines
Dichlorocarbene is an intermediate in the carbylamine reaction. In this conversion, a dichloromethane solution of a primary amine is treated with chloroform and aqueous sodium hydroxide in the presence of catalytic amount of the phase-transfer catalyst. Illustrative is the synthesis of tert-butyl isocyanide:
Me3CNH2 + CHCl3 + 3 NaOH → Me3CNC + 3 NaCl + 3 H2O

History
Dichlorocarbene as a reactive intermediate was first proposed by Anton Geuther in 1862 who viewed chloroform as CCl2.HCl Its generation was reinvestigated by Hine in 1950. The preparation of dichlorocarbene from chloroform and its utility in synthesis was reported by William von Eggers Doering in 1954.

Related reactions
The Doering–LaFlamme allene synthesis entails the conversion of alkenes to allenes (a chain extension) with magnesium or sodium metal through initial reaction of the alkene with dichlorocarbene. The same sequence is incorporated in the Skattebøl rearrangement to cyclopentadienes.

Closely related is the more reactive dibromocarbene CBr2.

Chlorocarbene
The related chlorocarbene (ClHC) can be generated from methyllithium and dichloromethane. It has been used in the synthesis of spiropentadiene.

See also
Tetrachloroethylene (CCl2)2 
Difluorocarbene

References

External links
Addition of dichlorocarbene to 2-methyl-1-buten-3-yne, laboratory procedure
 English translation of 1969 Polish patent on preparation of dichloropropane derivatives

Carbenes